Nooitgedacht is the name of several places:

 Nooitgedacht, Drenthe, a hamlet in the Netherlands.
 Nooitgedacht, Groningen, a hamlet in the Netherlands
 Nooitgedacht, South Africa
Nooit Gedacht, Sri Lanka, a colonial establishment in Unawatuna, Sri Lanka
 Nooitgedacht Glacial Pavements, the geological site with rock engravings between Kimberley and Barkly West, South Africa.

It is also the name of a number of windmills:
Nooit Gedacht, Afferden, a windmill in Limburg, Netherlands
Nooit Gedacht, Arnemuiden, a windmill in Zeeland, Netherlands
Nooit Gedacht, Budel, a windmill in North Brabant, Netherlands
Nooit Gedacht, Cadzand, a windmill in Zeeland, Netherlands
Nooit Gedacht, Colijnsplaat, a windmill in Zeeland, Netherlands
Nooit Gedacht, Eindewege, a windmill in Zeeland, Netherlands
Nooit Gedacht, Mechelen-aan-de-Maas, a windmill in Limburg, Belgium
Nooit Gedacht, Merselo, a windmill in Limburg, Netherlands
Nooitgedacht, Spijkenisse, a windmill in South Holland, Netherlands
Nooitgedacht, Veenoord, a windmill in Drenthe, the Netherlands
Nooit Gedacht, Woudrichem, a windmill in North Brabant, Netherlands

Other

 Nooitgedacht pony, a South African pony breed
 Nooitgedacht Ga-Phaphadi, a popular lodge/bar located in the Limpopo Province of South Africa around Bolobedu (Mopani District)